All-District Team may refer to:
Regional selections by United States Basketball Writers Association (USBWA) for top contributors in college basketball
Regional selections by National Association of Basketball Coaches (NABC) for top contributors in college basketball
Regional selections for Academic All-America honoring top college student athletes